Thailand competed at the 1992 Summer Paralympics in Barcelona, Spain. 5 competitors from Thailand won a single bronze medal and finished joint 50th in the medal table along with 5 other countries.

See also 
 Thailand at the Paralympics
 Thailand at the 1992 Summer Olympics

References 

Nations at the 1992 Summer Paralympics
1992
Summer Paralympics